Timur Magomedovich Dibirov (born 30 July 1983) is a Russian handball player who plays for RK Zagreb and the Russian national team.

He competed at the 2008 Summer Olympics in Beijing, where the Russian team placed sixth.

Besides the Russian, Dibirov also holds Macedonian citizenship.

Dibirov is all-time top scorer for RK Vardar in the EHF Champions League having scored 525 goals as of 19 November 2020.

Honours
RK Vardar
Macedonian Handball Super League: 2014–15, 2015–16, 2016–17, 2017–18, 2018–19, 2020-21,2021-22
Macedonian Handball Cup:  2014, 2015, 2016, 2017, 2018, 2021, 2022
Macedonian Handball Super Cup: 2017, 2018, 2019
SEHA League: 2013–14, 2016–17, 2017–18, 2018–19
EHF Champions League: 2016–17 , 2018–19

References

External links

1983 births
Living people
People from Petrozavodsk
Russian male handball players
Olympic handball players of Russia
Handball players at the 2008 Summer Olympics
Expatriate handball players
Russian expatriate sportspeople in North Macedonia
RK Vardar players
Avar people
Kutafin Moscow State Law University alumni
Sportspeople from the Republic of Karelia